Central School District is a K-8 school district in San Bernardino County, California that covers a portion of Rancho Cucamonga. The district currently serves approximately 5,200 students. The district feeds into Chaffey Joint Union High School District.

Schools

Elementary schools
Bear Gulch Elementary School
Central Elementary School
Coyote Canyon Elementary School
Doña Merced Elementary School
Valle Vista Elementary School

Middle schools
Cucamonga Middle School
Ruth Musser Middle School - Ruth Musser is located in Rancho Cucamonga, CA. It’s grade levels go through 5th- 8th. Ruth Musser is a public school and was originally named after a woman, Ruth Musser, that was involved with the Central School District. The school colors are teal, white, black, gray and their mascot is a bulldog. Ruth Musser's current principal is Mr. Robert Clobes.

References

External links
 

School districts in San Bernardino County, California